Bezirk Fürstenfeld is a former district of the state of 
Styria, Austria. Fürstenfeld merged with the district of Hartberg to form the new district Hartberg-Fürstenfeld on January 1, 2013.

Municipalities 
Towns (Städte) are indicated in boldface; market towns (Marktgemeinden) in italics; suburbs, hamlets and other subdivisions of a municipality are indicated in small characters.
 Altenmarkt bei Fürstenfeld
 Speltenbach, Stadtbergen
 Bad Blumau
 Bierbaum an der Safen, Jobst, Kleinsteinbach, Lindegg, Loimeth, Schwarzmannshofen, Speilbrunn
 Burgau
 Fürstenfeld
 Großsteinbach 
 Großhartmannsdorf, Kroisbach an der Feistritz
 Großwilfersdorf
 Hainfeld bei Fürstenfeld, Herrnberg, Maierhofbergen, Maierhofen, Radersdorf
 Hainersdorf
 Obgrün, Riegersdorf
 Ilz
 Buchberg bei Ilz, Dambach, Dörfl, Kalsdorf bei Ilz, Kleegraben, Leithen, Neudorf bei Ilz, Reigersberg
 Loipersdorf bei Fürstenfeld
 Dietersdorf bei Fürstenfeld, Gillersdorf
 Nestelbach im Ilztal
 Eichberg bei Hartmannsdorf, Hochenegg, Mutzenfeld, Nestelberg
 Ottendorf an der Rittschein
 Breitenbach, Walkersdorf, Ziegenberg
 Söchau
 Aschbach bei Fürstenfeld, Kohlgraben, Ruppersdorf, Tautendorf bei Fürstenfeld
 Stein
 Übersbach
 Ebersdorf, Hartl bei Fürstenfeld, Rittschein

External links 
 www.bh-fuerstenfeld.steiermark.at

Districts of Styria
States and territories disestablished in 2013